Alexandre Sperafico (born January 21, 1974, in Toledo, Paraná) is a Brazilian racing driver. He is the oldest of the four racing Speraficos.

From 2000 to 2001, and for one start in 2003, Alexandre competed in the Barber Dodge Pro Series and won a race at Sebring on the weekend of the 2001 12 Hours of Sebring. In 2002 he was one of the three Speraficos in Formula 3000, joining Ricardo and Rodrigo. He raced for the Minardi Junior Team in nine events.

In 2003 he returned stateside and made his Champ Car World Series debut for Dale Coyne. In 2004 he ran half of the season for Mi-Jack Conquest Racing and a few races for CTE-HVM Racing in 2005. Unable to find a seat on the grid in 2006, Sperafico moved to the Brooks Associates Racing team in the ultra competitive Atlantic Series. After this, he retired from the competition.

Motorsports career results

Complete International Formula 3000 results
(key) (Races in bold indicate pole position) (Races in italics indicate fastest lap)

Complete American Open-Wheel Racing results
(key)

Barber Dodge Pro Series

CART/Champ Car World Series

 ^ New points system implemented in 2004.

Atlantic Championship

References

External links

1974 births
Living people
Brazilian Champ Car drivers
Brazilian racing drivers
Atlantic Championship drivers
International Formula 3000 drivers
People from Toledo, Paraná
Barber Pro Series drivers
Alex
Formula 3 Sudamericana drivers
Sportspeople from Paraná (state)
Conquest Racing drivers
HVM Racing drivers
Dale Coyne Racing drivers